In This Skin is the third studio album by American recording artist Jessica Simpson. The album was released on August 19, 2003, by Columbia Records. It was reissued on March 2, 2004, with three new songs. Simpson began taking more creative control of her music with the album, both musically and lyrically, co-writing 10 out of 14 tracks on the album, thus moving away from the teen pop styles of her previous two albums, Sweet Kisses (1999) and Irresistible (2001), as well as including elements of Middle Eastern music, dance, acoustic, and pop rock, while also lyrically talking about more mature subject matters. The album was a huge success in North America, reaching number two on the US Billboard 200 and being certified triple platinum by the Recording Industry Association of America (RIAA). Internationally, In This Skin went on to become the thirty-fifth best selling album of 2004. It was ranked number 153 on the list of the top-selling albums of the 2000s by Billboard magazine. As of 2020, In This Skin has sold 7 million copies worldwide.

The album spawned four singles, including two top 20 hits, "With You" and "Take My Breath Away," which peaked at number fourteen and twenty on the Billboard Hot 100 respectively. "Sweetest Sin" and "Angels," the lead and final single, both failed to make an impact on charts.  Simpson performed songs from In This Skin on a number of occasions. In middle 2004, she embarked on her second headlining tour, titled the Reality Tour, to promote the album.

Background
After the release of her 2001 album Irresistible, Simpson stated she wanted to write songs for her third record. In an interview with MTV in October 2002, her then-husband, Nick Lachey, revealed that Simpson was in the studio, working on a new record. Lachey said, "She's finally writing her own music, which I've told her she could do forever but she's been shy about stepping out there and doing it. But she's an incredible writer, and she's doing stuff that's really from the heart." About the album's sound, he said, "It's a much more organic record and it's more true to herself ... There's all live instrumentation and it's very musical as opposed to the pop thing that was happening before for her. I think she finally feels like this is her record and her chance to do exactly what she wants." In March 2003, Simpson revealed that her third album would be called In This Skin.

Production and development

Simpson said in an interview with Billboard, "I wanted to make a romantic, organic album, there are songs that say something that I hope will move or inspire people." Billboard'''s Chuck Taylor compared the record to her first album, saying, "Simpson's soaring vocals give 'In This Skin' a smooth touch, as it sways between spirited midtempo melodies and her signature ballads."

Originally, the album was planned to be primarily produced by American rapper Missy Elliott, while the sole featured appearance was to be made by Nick Lachey. However, the pair's contributions never made the final cut of the album. About the recording process, Simpson said that A&R executive Teresa LaBarbera Whites "had the incredible idea of creating a songwriting camp. I would go from room to room with one songwriter after another... We would sit there for two or three hours—write an entire song—and then go in and record it in 90 minutes. It was so refreshing." Much of the album was recorded in Nashville and Los Angeles, with the help of established writers and producers.

"Sweetest Sin," the album's first single, was written by Diane Warren and is about losing one's virginity. MTV described the song as a "sweet track." In an interview with Billboard, Simpson said the song was "nothing negative, it's all about love." About the second single, "With You," Simpson said, "It's cool for me just because it's my personality ... Nick loves me with nothing but a T-shirt on so that's where the song idea came from."Billboard cited "I Have Loved You" and "Underneath" as the most expressive tracks from the album, citing the latter as "a four-month period where Simpson and Lachey called it quits, then-in the wake of Sep. 11, 2001 ... realized the value of making a relationship work." The magazine described the title track as "a plucky pop anthem about self-acceptance." About the song, Simpson said, "I was 102 pounds and people at the record label were telling me that I needed to lose weight. The song is saying that I am worthy to feel beautiful in my skin. It's something that every woman experiences in one way or another."

The album was subsequently reissued with three new recordings: an acoustic version of "With You" and two covers. The Berlin cover "Take My Breath Away" is Simpson and Lachey's love theme, she said, "because it was playing the first time Nick kissed me." Simpson also said that she had "been obsessed with 'Take My Breath Away' for a very long time." Another cover on the album was Robbie Williams' "Angels." Simpson described the recording session for the two songs as difficult because she had to do both songs in one day. Lachey helped produce the vocals for both songs, and Simpson credited him with helping her get in the right mood by keeping his hand in her back pocket "and being right there" during the recording session.

Critical reception

Initial critical response to In This Skin was mixed. Sal Cinquemani of Slant Magazine gave the album 2.5 stars and criticized it as "glossy, ever-so-slightly over-produced ... weighed down by soggy, overwrought pop ballads" and "sickeningly sweet" lyrics. However, he praised "Forbidden Fruit," comparing it to Madonna's single "Music," and "Loving You," which he described as "a seductively contrived reminder that, with teen pop long dead, Simpson should be aiming to recapture the club audience that helped launch her career with 'I Wanna Love You Forever.'"

Stephen Thomas Erlewine from AllMusic also gave the album 2.5 stars in a mixed review, writing, "The problem with In This Skin is that its heart is in the mature middle of the road but its sound is still pitched too young, making [it] a record that satisfies neither audience."

Jon Caramanica of Rolling Stone gave the album 2 stars, criticizing Simpson's lack of vocal "subtlety." However, he added, "Her powerful voice is done a disservice by insipid songwriting and arrangements — as on the loathsome club track 'Forbidden Fruit' and the uncomfortably stately ballad 'You Don't Have to Let Go' — that consistently get in the way of her pipes."

Commercial performanceIn This Skin debuted at number 10 on the Billboard 200 albums chart with 64,000 copies sold. Within five months of release, the album had sold 565,000 copies. In March 2004, the album was re-released and it jumped from number 16 to number two, selling 160,000 copies in that week and seeing a 205% increase in sales. It was her highest weekly sales at the time, beating the sales of her sophomore album Irresistible, which debuted at number six with 120,000 copies. On August 19, 2004, it was reported that after a year of release, In This Skin had sold over 2.4 million copies in the US. As of February 2009, it has sold 2.9 million copies, according to Billboard. In total the album charted on the Billboard 200 for 75 consecutive weeks. Towards the end of 2004 In This Skin was ranked at number 14 on Billboards year-end albums chart. In December 2004, the album was certified triple platinum by the RIAA for shipments of three million copies.

In Australia, April 4, the album debuted at number 40. In peaked at number 13 in its seventh week, becoming Simpson's highest album peak in Australia to date. In This Skin stayed in the top 50 for 27 weeks. The album was later certified Platinum by the ARIA. In Ireland, In This Skin debuted at number 58. In its second week fell to number 75, but in its fourth week the album rose to a new peak of number 27. The album remained in the top 75 for 8 weeks. In the UK, the album debuted at number 36, the same peak of her first album Sweet Kisses. It remained in the top 75 for 5 weeks. In Canada, the album reached number 45 in May 2004. The album stayed on the chart for 30 weeks. It was later certified Gold by the CRIA. In Switzerland, it peaked at number 78 and remained on the chart for three weeks. At the end of 2004 In This Skin was ranked as the 35th best selling album globally by the IFPI. As of 2020, In This Skin has sold 7 million copies worldwide.

Singles

"Sweetest Sin" was released as the lead single from In This Skin. The music video, directed by Dean Paraskavopoulos, starts with black-and-white shots of Simpson dancing and looking at viewers. It cuts to Simpson swaying on a beach, and embracing Nick Lachey underneath a waterfall on the beach. Further scenes are presented, such as one in which Simpson lies on a bed by herself. The video continues with intercut footage of the previous scenes, until the final seconds of the song, when Simpson is joined by her husband, in which they move on their bed on the beach. The video ends when Lachey disappears, leaving the singer alone. "With You" was released as the album's second single on September 16, 2003. The song received positive reviews from critics. Enjoyed more success, reaching at top ten on Australia and UK and top-twenty on Ireland, Norway and United States. The single was her first number one in Top 40 Mainstream chart. Later was certified Gold in US and Platinum on Australia. The video of the song was released as a DVD single. Simpson received one and only MTV Europe Music Award nomination for Best Female, enjoying her commercial success outside America. It received two MTV Video Music Award nominations for Best Female Video and Best Pop Video.

Promotion

Simpson performed "Sweetest Sin" live at the Trump Taj Mahal in Atlantic City, New Jersey. The performance, dedicated to Lachey, was recorded and later broadcast on the second season of Newlyweds: Nick and Jessica. "With You" was also performed on American late-night show The Tonight Show with Jay Leno and American morning show Live with Regis and Kelly on October 17 and October 23, 2003. She also gave a memorable performance of "With You"/"Angels" at 2004 MTV Video Music Awards. The promotion of "Angels" by Simpson was extensive; she sang a Spanglish duet of the song with Spanish singer David Bisbal at the 2004 Latin Grammy Awards, performed it on VH1 Divas 2004 and on shows like Late Show with David Letterman and The Early Show. She later performed it during the seventh season of Dancing with the Stars.

The Reality Tour
The Reality Tour to promote In This Skin was the second concert tour by Jessica Simpson. While promoting the re-release of her album, Simpson stated in several interviews the possibility of a tour, wanting to break away from filming her TV series and connect with her fans. The tour was officially announced in May 2004 through various media outlets, with sponsorship from Ice Breakers and Proactiv Solution.

During an interview with the Associated Press, the singer said she wanted the concerts to focus on her music and her personality. Onstage, Simpson was joined by a seven-piece band, with no dancers or choreography for the show. Simpson would perform songs from her three current albums, while providing anecdotes about her life and the songs. Unseen footage from her reality series and variety show (titled The Nick and Jessica Variety Hour'') were included in the show as well. Each night, the singer dedicated "I Have Loved You" to the American armed forces and conducted a Q&A session with contest winners.
 
Before the tour commenced, Simpson performed at several radio-sponsored music festivals including Your Show, Wango Tango, Summer Music Mania, Zootopia, Kiss Concert, and Play Safe in the Park.

The tour began in Chula Vista in May, visiting over 50 cities, ending in West Springfield. Despite early reports of poor ticket sales, Simpson's tour became one of the biggest summer tours in North America, prompting the singer to add more shows in the U.S. The tour ranked number 86 on Pollstar's "Top 100 Tours 2004", earning over seven million dollars.

Track listing

Original release

Reissue

Personnel
Credits adapted from AllMusic.

 J.D. Andrew – digital editing, engineer
 Jim Annunziato – assistant engineer, mixing assistant
 Romeo Antonio –  electric guitar
 Rich Balmer – engineer
 Greg Barnhill –  producer
 Charlie Bisharat – violin
 Dan Bucchi – mixing assistant
 Pat Buchanan – electric guitar
 Julian Bunetta – engineer, string arrangements, strings
 Darryl Bush – production coordination
 John Catchings – cello
 Earl Cohen – tracking
 J. T. Corenflos – electric guitar
 Chad Cromwell – drums
 Neil Devor – engineer
 Tony Duran – photography
 Damon Elliott –  keyboards, percussion, producer, programming
 Greg Fitzgerald –  producer
 Rob Fusari –  producer
 James Ginnetti – keyboards
 Chris Goercke – acoustic guitar
 Franne Golde –  piano, producer, vocals, background vocals
 Kara DioGuardi – background vocals
 Trina Harmon –  piano, producer, string arrangements, strings
 Carlos Henderson – bass
 Dan Hetzel – digital editing, engineer, mixing
 Hooshik – collage
 Jun Ishizeki – assistant engineer
 Richie Jones – producer, programming
 Jennifer Karr – background vocals
 Anthony Kilhoffer – assistant engineer
 Brendan Kuntz – assistant engineer, mixing assistant
 Eric Kupper – acoustic guitar, keyboards
 Holly Lamar –  producer
 Victor Lawrence – cello
 Kasia Livingston –  producer, background vocals
 Billy Mann – arranger,  drum programming, engineer, electric guitar, producer
 Lee Mars – mixing, vocal producer
 Andy Marvel – arranger,  drum programming, engineer, midi guitar, keyboard programming, producer
 Tony Maserati – mixing
 Dave Matthews – engineer
 Mary Maurer – art direction
 Bart Migal – tracking
 Nick Moroch – acoustic guitar
 Pablo Munguia – engineer, vocal engineer
 David Munk – vocal producer
 Dave Pensado – mixing
 Alison Prestwood – bass
 Greg Price – assistant engineer
 Mark Russell – production coordination
 Dave Scheuer – digital editing, engineer
 Jaime Sickora – engineer, vocal engineer
 Jessica Simpson –  primary artist, vocals
 Matt Snedecor – mixing assistant
 Michael Spriggs – acoustic guitar
 Keith Thomas – arranger, bass, keyboards, mixing, producer, programming
 Luz Vasquez – assistant engineer, mixing assistant
 John LeVasseur – engineer, Mellotron
 Rick Wake – producer
 Bill Whittington – mixing
 Andrew Williams – engineer, instrumentation, producer
 Ethan Willoughby – assistant
 Patrick Woodward – mixing
 Chris Yoakum – digital editing, MIDI technician
 Jonathan Yudkin – strings

Charts

Weekly charts

Year-end charts

Decade-end charts

Certifications and sales

Release history

References

2003 albums
Jessica Simpson albums
Albums produced by Ric Wake
Albums with cover art by Tony Duran
Columbia Records albums